AMCC is a four-letter abbreviation which may refer to:

Applied Micro Circuits Corporation, a semiconductor company
Allegheny Mountain Collegiate Conference, an intercollegiate athletic conference affiliated with the NCAA's Division III
Al-Madinah Cultural Center, a non-profit cultural student organization at the University of Minnesota
Aviators Model Code of Conduct, a publication and project providing voluntary flight safety guidance
Amikom Computer Club, the computer organization in STMIK Amikom Yogyakarta